Kingsman is a comic book series that debuted in 2012 with the first graphic novel, subtitled The Secret Service. Two sequels, subtitled The Big Exit and The Red Diamond, followed in 2017 and 2018 respectively. The series was initially known simply as The Secret Service before being rebranded following the release of the first film adaptation of the series. The series was created by Mark Millar and Dave Gibbons. It is set in Mark Millar's shared universe, the "Millarverse". For example, the celebrity kidnappings that take place in Kingsman Vol. 1 are referenced in Kick Ass: The Dave Lizewski Years Book Four.

Plot

The Secret Service (2012–13)
The first volume, The Secret Service (2012), is set over the course of three years. Gary "Eggsy" Unwin is recruited by his uncle, Jack London, to work for Kingsman, the British Secret Service. Eggsy is put on an extensive three-year training course, performing various assassinations and apprehending a Colombian drug lord. Whilst investigating a series of celebrity kidnappings perpetrated by Dr. James Arnold, a very wealthy cellphone entrepreneur who plans to use a satellite signal to make the poor of humanity slaughter each other in order to solve the overpopulation problem, London is killed by Arnold for sleeping with his girlfriend, unaware of his Kingsman allegiance. Horrified by his uncle's death, and learning that Arnold is supported by higher-level members of Kingsman, Eggsy recruits his fellow trainees to an assault mission on Arnold's base, hidden inside a mountain in Switzerland.

After ambushing and battling Arnold's troops, freeing the captured celebrities, including Pierce Brosnan, Patrick Stewart and David Beckham, Eggsy engages in a fist fight with Arnold's henchman and former Kingsman agent Gazelle, and leaves to confront Arnold. Arnold activates the satellite signal and waits for the people to slaughter each other, but instead, due to one of Eggsy's colleagues having changed the frequency, people worldwide begin to have sex with one another. Eggsy then kills a confused Arnold.

In an epilogue, Eggsy reads his uncle's will, revealing that two-thirds of Jack's estate will go to the Royal National Lifeboat Institution and the British Heart Foundation, the final third going to Eggsy's mother, informing Eggsy to take good care of his gadget-laden car, or he will "come back and bloody haunt him." As Eggsy reports to Kingsman Headquarters, Sir Giles briefs him about a mission that concerns "trouble in Moscow".

The Big Exit (2017)
A stand-alone six page one-shot, subtitled The Big Exit, was published in the September/October 2017 issue of  Playboy Magazine, written by Rob Williams and drawn by Ozgur Yildirim. Set shortly after Brexit, The Big Exit follows Eggsy as he is tasked with safeguarding the controversial "divorce fee" on its journey to Brussels, consisting of £100 billion in solid gold bars, from a group of pro-Brexit terrorists, "The Union Jacks", disguised as French activists to steal the gold back for the UK. It is eventually revealed that Eggsy's mission is in fact a decoy so that Kingsman themselves can destroy "The Union Jacks" and swipe the gold from both the British Parliament and the European Union and use it to fund hospitals and education services back in England.

The Red Diamond (2017–18)
The second volume of Kingsman, subtitled The Red Diamond, was released through Image Comics in September 2017, taking place over the course of one week. After knocking out Prince Philip following saving him from a group of Greek terrorists ignorant of the fact that the prince is Greek himself, Eggsy is put on a week-long leave of absence. Returning to Kingsman headquarters to retrieve a pill to treat his little brother Ryan's norovirus, an alert comes in from the South African Secret Service (SASS) regarding an encrypted message that was sent to a wanted hacker named Alias at Times Square in Manhattan. As the only agent present, Eggsy is sent out on a rocket to find Alias before the SASS.

Upon finding him, Eggsy is confronted by Kwaito - a SASS agent, and Ingot - a Red Diamond agent. Upon restraining Alias, Alias explains that he was trying to shut down the servers in the financial district to protect them from a virus released by the Red Diamond's agent. Ingot kills Alias and makes his escape, trapping Eggsy and Kwaito. Once he leaves, the virus is unleashed worldwide, causing a global blackout. The Prime Minister of Britain receives a Betamax tape from the head of the Red Diamond, self-made South African mining magnate Jakobis Du Preez, who explains his plans to replace the world's physical money with gold and jewels; in a separate tape, he invites the “Kings and Queens of the new material world” to a remote location in the Hunan Province, China.

Eggsy and Kwaito independently go undercover to the event only for Du Preez to set off a bomb to get rid of "the competition". Retrieving a map to the Red Diamond base from Ingot and crashing into a forest with Kwaito, Eggsy and Kwaito make love. Later finding civilization and a phone to use, Eggsy discovers that Kwaito has stolen the map. Having memorized it, Eggsy travels to Guam where he is reunited with Kwaito. Making their way inside the base, the pair find Du Preez sitting naked on a hill of jewels and gold bars. Du Preez explains that they cannot kill him lest a fail-safe he attached to his heart open the airlocks and kill everyone. After a confrontation with Ingot, Eggsy shoots Du Preez with a poisonous spy-dart which will slowly kill him, and makes his escape with Kwaito and Treeman, a hacker held captive by Du Preez. Whilst fleeing, Treeman gains access to a Red Diamond computer and uploads an override to delete the Red Diamond virus. In the epilogue, a ceremony is held in Eggsy's honour. Several esteemed guests are invited—including Prince Philip, who wants to apologise and shake Eggsy's hand. However, Eggsy instead takes his family and Kwaito to his favourite pub.

Adaptations

In 2015, a film series was launched with an adaptation of The Secret Service. To date, it has been followed by a sequel Kingsman: The Golden Circle in 2017 and a spin-off The King's Man in 2021, with more sequels and spin-offs planned.

Collected editions

Notes

References

Comics by Mark Millar
Icon Comics titles
American comics adapted into films
Kingsman (franchise)